Kartik Jeshwant (born 27 September 1964) is a former Indian first-class cricketer who played for Karnataka cricket team from 1985/86 to 1995/96. He worked as a cricket coach after retirement and became the head coach of the Karnataka team twice. He also became a cricket commentator in Kannada-language.

Life and career
Kartik Jeshwant was born on 27 September 1964 in Mangalore. He studied in St. Joseph's Boys' High School, Bangalore.

Jeshwant played for Karnataka as an all-rounder who batted left-handed and bowled slow left-arm orthodox. He also captained Karnataka and appeared for South Zone cricket team. Jeshwant appeared in 68 first-class matches, scoring close to 4000 runs and taking over 100 wickets. He appeared for Rest of India in the 1988–89 Irani Cup match against Tamil Nadu. His highest first-class score of 259 not out came against Tamil Nadu at Coimbatore in December 1990 and was the highest score by a Karnataka batsman against Tamil Nadu until 2015. He was part of the Karnataka team that won the 1995–96 Ranji Trophy, which was also his last season in first-class cricket.

Jeshwant was the head coach of Karnataka for two seasons in the early-2000s. He became the head coach again for the 2011/12 season.

References

External links 
 
 

1964 births
Living people
Indian cricketers
Karnataka cricketers
South Zone cricketers
Indian cricket coaches
Cricketers from Mangalore